Šárka, opus 51, is an opera in three acts by Zdeněk Fibich to a Czech libretto by Anežka Schulzová, his student and lover.  Fibich composed the full score over the period of 8 September 1896 to 10 March 1897.  At the time, Czech audiences regarded Fibich with suspicion as being overly influenced by the music of Richard Wagner, and Fibich had selected the legend of Šárka for this operatic subject to try to counter such sentiments.  Even so, the opera still contains use of Wagner's idea of leitmotif.

The subject matter, the Bohemian legend of Šárka, which appears in 14th-century Czech literature, is related to that of Smetana's tone poem Má vlast and the opera of the same name by Janáček.  Schulzová used as her primary literary source an 1880 version of the story by J. Vrchlický.

Performance history
The opera received its first performance at the Prague National Theatre on 28 December 1897. Šárka is Fibich's most popular opera and is regularly revived in the Czech Republic.

There are two archive radio recordings (1950, 1970) and three commercial recordings:
 Marie Podvalová (Šárka), Lubomír Havlák (tenor Ctirad), :cs:Václav Bednář (Prince Premysl), Marta Krásová (Vlasta), Milada Šubrtová (Libyna), Miloslava Fidlerová (Svatava), Jaroslava Vymazalová (Mlada), Ludmila Hanzalíková (Radka), Marie Zalabáková (Hosta), Jaroslava Dobrá (Castava) & Jaroslav Veverka (Vitoraz). Prague National Theatre Chorus and Orchestra, conducted by Zdeněk Chalabala. Supraphon 1953
 Eva Děpoltová (Šárka), Vilém Přibyl (Ctirad), Václav Zítek (baritone, Prince Premysl), Jaroslavá Janska (soprano, Libina), Bozena Effenberkova (soprano, Svatava), Jitka Pavlová (soprano, Mlada), Anna Barová, (mezzo, Radka), Véra Bakalová (alto, Hosta), Daniela Suryova (alto, Castava), Eva Randová (mezzo-soprano, Vlasta), :cs:Josef Klán (bass, Vitoraz). Brno State Philharmonic Orchestra,  Brno Janáček Opera Chorus  Conductor Jan Štych. Supraphon 1978
 Eva Urbanová (Šárka), Janez Lotrič (tenor, Ctirad), Dalibor Jenis (Prince Premysl), Ida Kirilová (Vlasta), Simona Šaturová (Libyna), :sk:Adriana Kohútková (Svatava), Klaudia Dernerová Mlada;  (mezzo) Hana Minutillo Radka;  Marta Beňačková (Hosta), Adriana Hlasová (Castava) & Vladimir Kubovcik (Vitoraz). Vienna Concert Choir; Vienna Radio Symphony Orchestra conducted Sylvain Cambreling. Orfeo 2001 Live

Roles

References

External links

Czech-language operas
Operas by Zdeněk Fibich
1897 operas
Operas